Padriac William Fisher (born January 22, 1998) is an American football linebacker for the Michigan Panthers of the United States Football League (USFL). He played college football for the Northwestern Wildcats.

High school career
Fisher attended Katy High School in Katy, Texas. As a senior in 2015, Fisher earned All-State and All-District honors after leading Katy to a Class 6A Division II State Championship and the No. 1 ranking in the nation, according to MaxPreps. Over the course of his varsity career, he tallied 350 tackles, 25 tackles for loss, eight sacks, and eight forced fumbles.

Recruiting
Fisher was a consensus three-star recruit and received a dozen scholarship offers, from Baylor, Houston, Wisconsin, and Northwestern, among others.
Fisher committed to Northwestern on June 30, 2015, signed his letter of intent on National Signing Day in February 2016, and enrolled in June.

College career
Fisher redshirted the 2016 season. In the 2017 season, Fisher earned Freshman All-America honors from the FWAA and was named the Big Ten Freshman Defensive Player of the Year by the Big Ten Network after recording 113 tackles, nine tackles for loss, four forced fumbles, and one interception. In 2018 as a redshirt sophomore, Fisher finished with 116 tackles, 5 tackles for loss, and four forced fumbles and an interception to earn nominations to the Big Ten First-team and the Associated Press All-America Third-team. The next year in 2019, Fisher registered 88 tackles, six tackles for loss, as well as one interception and one forced fumble in 12 games.

Career statistics

Professional career

Carolina Panthers
Fisher signed with the Carolina Panthers as an undrafted free agent on May 10, 2021. He was waived on August 28, 2021.

Los Angeles Chargers
On October 26, 2021, Fisher was signed to the Los Angeles Chargers practice squad. He was released on November 2, 2021.

Michigan Panthers
On August 22, 2022, Fisher signed with the Michigan Panthers of the United States Football League (USFL).

References

External links
Northwestern Wildcats bio

Living people
People from Katy, Texas
Players of American football from Texas
Sportspeople from Harris County, Texas
American football linebackers
Northwestern Wildcats football players
Carolina Panthers players
Year of birth missing (living people)
Michigan Panthers (2022) players